The 2012 Setanta Sports Cup was the seventh staging of the annual all-Ireland association football competition. It commenced on 11 February 2012 and ended on 12 May 2012, with the final played at The Oval, Belfast.

The draw for the 2012 competition was made at Aviva Stadium, Dublin, on 25 January 2012.

Crusaders won the competition for the first time, defeating Derry City 5–4 on penalties after the scores were level at 2–2 after extra time. It was the first time a club from the Northern Irish IFA Premiership had won the cup since Linfield won the inaugural competition in 2005.

First round
Four League of Ireland and four IFA Premiership teams played each other in the first round over two games with the winners qualifying for the quarter-finals. The first legs were played on 11 and 13 February and the second legs were played on 20 February.

|}

First Leg

Second leg

Cliftonville won 2 − 0 on aggregate

Derry City won 7 − 0 on aggregate

Bohemians won 3 − 1 on aggregate

Glentoran won 7 − 2 on aggregate

Quarter-finals
The winners of the four first-round games joined the four seeded teams (Shamrock Rovers, Sligo Rovers, Crusaders, and Linfield) who received byes into the quarter-finals. The first legs were played on 5 March 2012 and the second legs were played on 20 March 2012. The draw for the quarter-finals was made on 20 February 2012.

|}

First leg

Second leg

Crusaders won 2 − 0 on aggregate

Shamrock Rovers won 3 – 1 on penalties after 2 – 2 draw on aggregate 

Derry City won 4 − 2 on aggregate

Sligo Rovers won 3 − 1 on aggregate

Semi-finals
The draw for the semi-finals was made following the second leg quarter-final matches.

|}

First leg

Second leg

Crusaders won 3 − 2 on aggregate

Derry City won 3 − 2 on aggregate

Final

Goalscorers
6 goals
  Rory Patterson (Derry City)

3 goals
  Stephen McLaughlin (Derry City)
  Colin Coates (Crusaders)

2 goals

  Romauld Boco (Sligo Rovers)
  Darren Boyce (Glentoran)
  Joe Gormley (Cliftonville)
  Leon Knight (Glentoran)
  Patrick McEleney (Derry City)
  Mark Quigley (Sligo Rovers)
  David Rainey (Crusaders)
  Gary Twigg (Shamrock Rovers)
  Kieran Waters (Bray Wanderers)

1 goal

  Liam Boyce (Cliftonville)
  Kevin Braniff (Portadown)
  Declan Caddell (Crusaders)
  Daniel Corcoran (Bohemians)
  Billy Dennehy (Shamrock Rovers)
  Kevin Deery (Derry City)
  Colin Hawkins (Shamrock Rovers)
  Barry Johnston (Cliftonville)
  Philip Lowry (Linfield)
  Simon Madden (Derry City)
  Adam Martin (Bohemians)
  Ryan McBride (Derry City)
  David McDaid (Derry City)
  David McMaster (Crusaders)
  Barry Molloy (Derry City)
  Karl Moore (Bohemians)
  Martin Murray (Glentoran)
  Colin Nixon (Glentoran)
  Danny North (Sligo Rovers)
  Jim O'Hanlon (Glentoran)
  Peter Thompson (Linfield)
  Sean Ward (Glentoran)

References

2012
1
2011–12 in Northern Ireland association football